The Udyan Pandit Award is given for excellence in fruit cultivation in India.  An award is given in each of the categories of apple, banana, grapes, guava, mandarin, mango, pineapple, and sweet orange.  It is sponsored by the National Horticultural Board  and awarded at both state. and national levels.

See also

 List of agriculture awards

References

Indian awards
Agriculture awards of India
Year of establishment missing